William Race Allison was an Australian politician and landowner. He was a member of the Tasmanian Legislative Council from 1846 to 1855, the member for Campbell Town in the House of Assembly from 1856 to 1862, and the member for Hobart Town in the House of Assembly from 1862 to his death in 1865.

References 

Tasmanian politicians
People from Tasmania
1812 births
1865 deaths